Marianela De La Hoz (born June 14, 1956) is a Mexican painter who depicts family life, couples, and Catholicism from a humanistic perspective.

Biography 
Marianela was born in Mexico City but moved to San Diego in 2012 when she was 40 years old. She earned a bachelor's degree in Graphic Design while attending Universidad Autonoma Metropolitana in Mexico City. She worked as a graphic designer for ten years before she decided to become a painter. Her passion for art began at an early age but it wasn't until she turned 25, that she decided to focus on creating  paintings instead digital graphics. Her idea of magic realism is labeled "white violence" due to her capability to use black humor and fantasy to demonstrate the darker side of humanity. She struggles with expressing herself efficiently but her art conveys everything she has to say.

Art 

 2013, Heaven and Earth, the Determined Freedom for an Undetermined Life, San Diego Museum of Art
 Mundos Pequeños/Small Worlds, Lora Schlesinger Gallery, Santa Monica, CA
 Adiós a la Calle, Torre ejecutiva de PEMEX, México City. México

References

External links 
 Artist website: http://www.marianeladelahoz.com

Living people
1956 births
20th-century Mexican women artists
21st-century Mexican women artists
20th-century Mexican painters
21st-century Mexican painters
Artists from Mexico City
Universidad Autónoma Metropolitana alumni
Mexican women painters
Wikipedia Student Program